Tolosaldea is one of the eight comarcas in Gipuzkoa, formed by 28 municipalities. Tolosa is the main town.
An estimated 47,880 people live in the area in 2018.

Municipalities

External links
 Official Website .

References

Toloaldea